Dion Elijah Scott (born 24 December 1980) is an English footballer who played in the Football League for Walsall, where he began his career, and Kidderminster Harriers, for whom he scored his only League goal, an 83rd-minute header to equalise away to Carlisle United in the Third Division. A defender, he was also on the books of Mansfield Town, where injury prevented his playing for them in the League, and appeared in non-league football for teams including Boston United (in two spells), Nuneaton Borough, AFC Telford United, Wernley Athletic, Sutton Coldfield Town, Oldbury Athletic. and Tividale. He is the older brother of footballer David Davis.

References

External links

1980 births
Living people
People from Warley, West Midlands
English footballers
Association football defenders
Walsall F.C. players
Boston United F.C. players
Mansfield Town F.C. players
Kidderminster Harriers F.C. players
Nuneaton Borough F.C. players
AFC Telford United players
Sutton Coldfield Town F.C. players
Oldbury Athletic F.C. players
English Football League players
National League (English football) players
Southern Football League players
Northern Premier League players
Black British sportsmen